Ferndale is a city in Whatcom County, Washington, United States. The population was 11,415 at the 2010 census. It is the third largest city in Whatcom County and located near the Lummi Nation.

History
First settled in 1872, Ferndale was given its name because of the ferns that once grew around the original school house. Ferndale was originally called Jam because the town was located next to a log jam on the Nooksack River, but the original schoolteacher decided it needed a more picturesque name.  Ferndale was officially incorporated on March 19, 1907.

Geography
Downtown Ferndale is located near the river, along with Griffintown and a largely industrial area east of the Nooksack River. Northwest of these areas are suburban developments. Ferndale borders Hovander Homestead Park and Tennant Lake along its southeast boundary.

Demographics

As of 2010 the median household income in the city was $52,831, and the median income for a family was $64,638. Males had a median income of $47,917 versus $37,447 for females. The per capita income for the city was $23,837. About 13.3% of families and 16.8% of the population were below the poverty line, including 24.2% of those under age 18 and 7.3% of those age 65 or over.

2010 census
As of the census of 2010, there were 11,415 people, 4,210 households, and 3,025 families residing in the city. The Washington state Office of Financial Management estimated for its April 1 annual population estimate that Ferndale had grown to 14,354 residents in 2019.

The racial makeup of the city was 83.1% White, 1.0% African American, 2.6% Native American, 3.6% Asian, 0.2% Pacific Islander, 5.2% from other races, and 4.2% from two or more races. Hispanic or Latino of any race were 12.0% of the population.

There were 4,210 households, of which 40.8% had children under the age of 18 living with them, 53.7% were married couples living together, 13.6% had a female householder with no husband present, 4.6% had a male householder with no wife present, and 28.1% were non-families. 22.7% of all households were made up of individuals, and 9.5% had someone living alone who was 65 years of age or older. The average household size was 2.71 and the average family size was 3.20.

The median age in the city was 34.2 years. 29.1% of residents were under the age of 18; 8.6% were between the ages of 18 and 24; 27.2% were from 25 to 44; 24% were from 45 to 64; and 10.9% were 65 years of age or older. The gender makeup of the city was 48.6% male and 51.4% female.

Climate
Ferndale experiences a mild climate, with no average monthly temperatures above . Although Ferndale has slightly higher average wind speeds for much of the year, average temperatures, cloud cover and rainfall are similar to other lowland communities in western Whatcom County, such as Bellingham and Lynden. Ferndale averages slightly less snow than Lynden.

Economy
Originally, Ferndale's economy was based on timber, and shortly after, agriculture of the surrounding land. Dairy processing was a significant employer for the town, and the old Carnation dairy plant has since been converted to offices. The construction of the Ferndale Refinery west of town in the 1950s caused a population boom in the town. The Cherry Point Refinery was constructed to the northwest in the 1970s. A shoe manufacturing plant for Brooks Sports, capable of producing 500,000 pairs of shoes annually, resides in the city. On April 22, 2020, Alcoa announced plans to close the Intalco aluminum smelter, located five miles away, laying off 700 workers. The city also serves as a bedroom community for Bellingham.

Transportation
The main highway serving Ferndale is Interstate 5. The town is also bisected by the BNSF Railway, which provides freight service and carries Amtrak Cascades passenger trains.

Sister city
Ferndale has the following sister city relationship:

  Minamibōsō, Chiba Prefecture, Japan.

Notable people
 Jesse Brand – Nashville songwriter, musician, and actor
 Dennis Erickson – Retired college football and NFL head coach 
 Michael Koenen – Former punter for the Tampa Bay Buccaneers
 Jake Locker – Former NFL quarterback for the Tennessee Titans
 Daran Norris – actor, most notably for voice work and a recurring role on the television series Veronica Mars
 Doug Pederson – Former NFL quarterback, head coach of the Jacksonville Jaguars
 Wendy B. Lawrence – Former NASA astronaut, former captain in the US Navy

References

External links
 
 
 

Cities in Washington (state)
Cities in Whatcom County, Washington